The Correspondence with Enemies Act 1798 (38 Geo.3 c.28) was an Act of the British Parliament.

France had declared war on Great Britain in 1793, near the beginning of the French Revolutionary Wars. In response, the British Parliament had passed the Correspondence with Enemies Act 1793 to prohibit trade with France. In 1795 France invaded the Republic of the United Provinces (the Netherlands) and founded the Batavian Republic there. On 5 April 1798, Parliament passed this Act to extend the provisions of the 1793 Act to the French-occupied Netherlands (still described in the Act as the "United Provinces").

Provisions of the Acts

The 1793 Act had made it high treason for any person resident in Great Britain to "knowingly and wilfully" supply materials to France during the war, without a licence from the king. Buying land in France, or lending somebody money with which to buy land in France, was also made treason. Merely travelling to France was punishable with imprisonment for up to 6 months. Any insurance policy relating to any ship or wares belonging to French subjects was made void.

The same rules also applied to the Netherlands from 1798.

The rules of procedure and evidence contained in the Treason Act 1695 and the Treason Act 1708 applied to treason under these Acts. The Acts did not apply to anyone in the army or navy (but such people were subject to military or naval law instead).

Commencement

The Act contained an unusual feature (also found in the 1793 Act), in that instead of coming into force on one particular date, it instead came into force on different dates in different parts of the world.

See also
Treason Act
High treason in the United Kingdom

Great Britain Acts of Parliament 1798